Sir Anthony Alfred Bowlby, 1st Baronet  (10 May 1855 – 7 April 1929) was a British Army officer, surgeon and pathologist.

Early life
Anthony Bowlby was born in Namur, Belgium, the third son of Thomas William Bowlby (1818–1860) and Frances Marion Bowlby nee Mein, the daughter of an army surgeon. In 1860 Bowlby's father, a correspondent to The Times, died in captivity in China.

Anthony was educated at Durham School and St Bartholomew's Hospital, London (1876), qualifying as a Member of the Royal College of Surgeons in 1879.

Career
In 1880 he was appointed House Surgeon at St Bartholomew's, was promoted to Surgical Registrar to the Hospital and Demonstrator of Practical Surgery in 1884, then to Assistant Surgeon and in 1903 to full Surgeon. During the Second Boer War (1899–1900) he served as a medical officer in South Africa at the Portland Field Hospital, Bloemfontein, after which he was invested as a Companion of the Order of St Michael and St George

He was Surgeon to King Edward VII's Household between 1904 and 1910 and Honorary Surgeon-in-Ordinary to King George V in 1910. He was made a Knight Bachelor in 1911.

He served in France in the First World War as Consulting Surgeon to the Forces, with the rank of Major-General, Army Medical Services and towards the end of the war became Adviser on Surgery for the whole of the British area, Front and Base. His main achievement was the development of Casualty Clearing Stations into quasi hospitals carrying out major surgery.

In 1904, he was listed honorary medical staff at King Edward VII's Hospital for Officers. He served as a Councillor of the Royal College of Surgeons of England from 1904 until 1920, when he became President for three years. He delivered the Bradshaw Lecture in 1915 on the subject of "Wounds in War" and gave the Hunterian Oration in 1919. After serving as President, he was created a baronet, of Manchester Square, in the Baronetage of the United Kingdom. 

He had been made a Knight Commander of the Order of the Bath in 1911.

Personal life
As a young man, Bowlby reportedly decided to delay marriage in order to take care of his widowed mother until her death. 

In 1898 he married Maria Bridget Mostyn, the daughter of Canon the Hon. Hugh Wynne Mostyn. The couple had three sons and three daughters.

He died on holiday at Stoney Cross, Lyndhurst, on 7 April 1929, was cremated at Brookwood, and buried at Brooklands Cemetery. 

He was succeeded as Baronet by his eldest son, Anthony Hugh Mostyn Bowlby.

Honours and arms
 Fellow of the Royal College of Surgeons, 1881
 Knight Bachelor, 1911
 K.C.M.G., 1915
 K.C.V.O., 1916
 K.C.B, 1919
 D.S.M. (U.S.), 1919
 President of the Royal College of Surgeons 1920–23.
 Honorary D.C.L., Durham University, 1923.

He was created 1st Baronet Bowlby, of Manchester Square, Borough of St. Marylebone [U.K.] on 17 July 1923.

Publications
 Surgical Pathology and Morbid Anatomy, 16mo, London, 1887.
 Injuries and Diseases of Nerves and their Surgical Treatment, 8vo, 20 plates. London, 1889; Philadelphia, 1890.
 A Civilian War Hospital, with Cuthbert Sidney Wallace, being an account of the work of the Portland Hospital and of experience of wounds and sickness in South Africa, 1900 (etc.), 8vo, 50 plates, London, 1901.

References

1855 births
1929 deaths
People educated at Durham School
English pathologists
English surgeons
Fellows of the Royal College of Surgeons
Knights Commander of the Order of St Michael and St George
Knights Commander of the Royal Victorian Order
Knights Commander of the Order of the Bath
Baronets in the Baronetage of the United Kingdom
Knights Bachelor